Last Week Tonight with John Oliver (often abridged as Last Week Tonight) is an American late-night talk and news satire television program hosted by comedian John Oliver. The half-hour-long show was created by Oliver, who also serves as an executive producer, and premiered on HBO on April 27, 2014.

Last Week Tonight has received critical acclaim and won numerous major awards, including 26 Primetime Emmy Awards, two Peabody Awards, eight Producers Guild Awards, five Writers Guild of America Awards, three Critics' Choice Television Awards, four TCA Awards, and has been nominated for six Directors Guild of America Awards.

Awards and nominations

ACE Eddie Awards
The ACE Eddie Awards are an annual accolade bestowed by the American Cinema Editors (ACE) in recognition of outstanding achievements in film and television editing. As of 2022, Last Week Tonight has received one nomination.

Critics' Choice Real TV Awards
The Critics' Choice Real TV Awards are an annual accolade bestowed by the Critics Choice Association in recognition of outstanding achievements in nonfiction, unscripted and reality television, since 2019. As of 2021, Last Week Tonight has won two awards from a total of two nominations.

Critics' Choice Television Awards
The Critics' Choice Television Award is an annual accolade bestowed by the Broadcast Television Journalists Association in recognition of outstanding achievements in television, since 2011. As of 2022, Last Week Tonight has won three awards from a total of six nominations.

Directors Guild of America Awards
The Directors Guild of America Award is an annual accolade bestowed by the Directors Guild of America in recognition of outstanding achievements in film and television directing, since 1938. As of 2022, Last Week Tonight has received a total of six nominations.

Dorian Awards
The Dorian Awards are an annual accolade bestowed by GALECA: The Society of LGBTQ Entertainment Critics in recognition of outstanding achievements in film and television. In 2020, GALECA split the film awards and the television awards into separate ceremonies. As of 2022, Last Week Tonight has won two awards from a total of nine nominations.

GLAAD Media Awards
The GLAAD Media Award is an annual accolade bestowed by GLAAD to recognize and honor various branches of the media for their outstanding representations of the lesbian, gay, bisexual and transgender (LGBT) community and the issues that affect their lives. As of 2023, Last Week Tonight has won two awards from a total of five nominations.

Hollywood Critics Association TV Awards
The HCA TV Awards are an annual accolade bestowed by the Hollywood Critics Association in recognition of achievements in television and streaming. It will be awarded for the first time in 2021. As of 2022, Last Week Tonight has won one award from two nominations.

MTV Movie & TV Awards
The MTV Movie & TV Awards is a film and television awards show presented annually on MTV. The nominees are decided by producers and executives at MTV and the winners are decided online by the general public. As of 2020, Last Week Tonight has received one nomination.

Peabody Awards
The George Foster Peabody Awards, or simply Peabody Awards, are named after American businessman and philanthropist George Peabody, and recognize distinguished and meritorious public service by American radio and television stations, networks, online media, producing organizations, and individuals. Last Week Tonight has received two awards.

People's Choice Awards
The People's Choice Awards is an American awards show, recognizing people in entertainment, voted online by the general public and fans. The show has been held annually since 1975. As of 2022, Last Week Tonight has received four nominations.

Primetime Emmy Awards
Awarded since 1949, the Primetime Emmy Award is an annual accolade bestowed by members of the Academy of Television Arts & Sciences recognizing outstanding achievements in American prime time television programming. As of 2022, Last Week Tonight has won 26 awards from a total of 57 nominations.

Producers Guild of America Awards
The Producers Guild of America Award is an annual accolade bestowed by the Producers Guild of America in recognition of outstanding achievements in film and television producing, since 1990. As of 2023, Last Week Tonight has won eight awards from a total of nine nominations.

Television Critics Association Awards
The TCA Awards are an annual accolade bestowed by the Television Critics Association in recognition of outstanding achievements in television. As of 2022, Last Week Tonight has won four awards from a total of eight nominations.

Webby Awards
The Webby Award is an award for excellence on the Internet presented annually by The International Academy of Digital Arts and Sciences, a judging body composed of over two thousand industry experts and technology innovators. Categories include websites, advertising and media, online film and video, mobile sites and apps, and social. As of 2020, Last Week Tonight has won two awards from a total of four nominations.

Writers Guild of America Awards
The Writers Guild of America Award is an annual accolade bestowed by the Writers Guild of America in recognition of outstanding achievements in film, television, and radio, since 1949. As of 2023, Last Week Tonight has won five awards from a total of eight nominations.

References

External links 

 
Last Week Tonight with John Oliver